Dowager Shi may refer to:

Queen Dowager Shi (died  920), concubine of the late-Tang warlord Yang Xingmi and the mother of Yang Wu rulers Yang Wo and Yang Longyan
Grandmother Jia, a character from the Chinese novel Dream of the Red Chamber

See also
She Saihua or Dowager She, a character from the Generals of the Yang Family legends